Bellevue-la-Montagne is a commune in the Haute-Loire département in south-central France.

Population

Personalities
 Guy Debord (Champot)

See also
Communes of the Haute-Loire department

References

Communes of Haute-Loire